Lance's Right (also known as HT's) is a surf reef break located in Indonesia, off Sipore Island, part of Sumatra's Mentawai Island chain. A reef break is an area in the ocean where waves start to break once they reach the shallows of a reef. Lance's Right is known as one of the most perfect waves, and the crown jewel of the Mentawai Isles.

Origin of the name 
It is known as a right, which means the wave breaks from right to left from the perspective of a watcher on shore. The location is named after the first person to find this wave, Lance Knight. Lance Knight came to the Mentawai Islands in 1991 in search of new waves, and eventually paid a local man in a canoe to take him upon the wave now known as Lance's Right. 

 A group of surfers on the boat Indies Trader found Lance 2 weeks later, and the captain, Martin Daly, named the spot Lance's Right in honor of the first person to surf it.

The other name, HTs, is an abbreviation for Hollow Trees, because of a hollow tree that was on the point but has since washed away.

Many charter boat operators consider the name disrespectful to the history of the wave and how it came to be renowned.

Specifics of the break 
The break at Lance's Right is a deceptively shallow reef, with an inside section known as the "surgeon's table", for the common injuries that happen to surfers who get stuck and cut on the flat section of the reef.  The end section is known as The Cage, where many photographers sit in boats and take photos of the surfers.

Competitions 
In April 2016, the Rip Curl Mentawai Pro was held as a World Surf League (WSL) and Asian Surfing Championship (ASC) event at Lance's Right. Australian Chris Zaffis won the title, beating Indonesian surfer Dede Suryana in the final round.

References 

Beaches of Indonesia
Surfing locations in Indonesia
Mentawai Islands Regency